In Belgium, a regulation is a form of legislation passed by the Brussels Parliament in exercise of its agglomeration competences and by the Common Community Commission in certain cases.

See also
Ordinance (Belgium)

Belgian legislation
Parliament of the Brussels-Capital Region